Yucca necopina Shinners, the Brazos River yucca or Glen Rose yucca, is a species in the family Asparagaceae. It is a rare endemic native to a small region in north-central Texas.

Description 
This plant is a perennial shrub that grows in small colonies of rosettes. The plant grows to a height of 2 feet, with bloom stalks reaching a height of 7 feet. Its flowers are greenish-white and bloom in Spring. The species is similar to Y. pallida and Y. arkansana, and at one time it was thought the species could be a hybrid of the two; later DNA evidence supports it being distinct.

Distribution and habitat 
This species grows in river terraces and deep sand, and is native to Somervell, Hood, Parker, and Tarrant Counties in Texas, west of Dallas and Fort Worth.

References

Endemic flora of Texas
necopina
Plants described in 1958